Juan Seguín Elementary School may refer to:
 Juan Seguín Elementary School - Fort Bend County, Texas - Fort Bend Independent School District
 Juan Seguín Elementary School - Houston, Texas - Houston Independent School District
 Juan Seguín Elementary School - McAllen, Texas - McAllen Independent School District
 Juan Seguín Elementary School - Mission, Texas - La Joya Independent School District